Fromaigeat is a surname. Notable people with the surname include:

 Marie Fromaigeat, Swiss slalom canoeist
 Jacques Fromaigeat (1913–1988), French philatelist